Saeed Meer, (born 25 November 1947, in Meerut), the former Pakistan No. 2 tennis player, had a successful Davis Cup career, with a 26–14 win–loss record.

Career
Meer played his first tournament at the East of England Championships in 1968. In April 1972 he won his first tournament at the Karachi Open against Meer Mohammed Khan. In the summer of 1972 he was touring in Great Britain and won the West Warwickshire Open at Solihull, England against the Nigerian player Thompson Onibokun. In 1973, he made it to the second round at Newport, United Kingdom he also went on to play at Seattle and Fort Worth in the United States. The following year, he played at Louisville, US. In 1974, he made it to the second round of the Wimbledon singles. Also that year he won the Ceylon Championships at Nuwara Eliya.

Meer, also twice made it to the first round doubles of the US Open, once at the Australian Open, the French Open and Wimbledon. In the mixed doubles, he made it to the second round of the US Open and second round of Wimbledon. In 1976, Saeed Meer played at the Iran International Championships in Tehran. In 1977 he won the East of England Championships at Felixstowe against Ali Kahn.  His final ATP tournament was at the Western Australian Open at Perth, Australia, in 1980, being knocked out in the first round. 

He currently coaches at the Beach View Club, Sea View in Karachi, Pakistan.

External links

Pakistani male tennis players
Living people
1947 births
Asian Games medalists in tennis
Tennis players at the 1974 Asian Games
Muhajir people
Asian Games bronze medalists for Pakistan
Medalists at the 1974 Asian Games